James Russell was a Scottish professional footballer who played as a wing half.

References

Scottish footballers
Association football wing halves
Cambuslang F.C. players
Grimsby Town F.C. players
St Bernard's F.C. players
English Football League players